The Setif Park Mall is a shopping mall in Sétif, Algeria.

The construction of the Centre Commercial Sétif was in charge of the Algerian group. The Construction began in May 2011 and completion on 4 February 2016.

Description
Park Mall with an area of 14 hectares and 41 250 m2 useful. The first floor houses a Uno hypermarket of the Cevital group. The second floor houses signs, franchised stores. The third floor, along the avenue of the ALN is intended for recreation with no less than 7 000 m2 of games and fun activities for children and adults, 138 m2 bowling hall with 10 tracks, 6 kiosks, 2 cafeterias, a 400 m2 ice rink with terraces, a cinema area 7 D. The fourth floor with an area of 7000 m2 is home to 13 restaurants, which have views of the city, Vivarea Food and Food Court.

The second 17-storey tower houses a large, 192-room, 4-star hotel in the international Marriott chain. The 18-storey tower houses offices and services, the last 5 floors of which house some twenty luxury apartments of nearly 200 m2 each. The other 8 floors house no fewer than 28 business and service offices. The space adjacent to the hotel houses a 1,822 m2 conference room. The rest of the complex houses a meeting room, a fitness room and a swimming pool. he basement of the complex houses a parking of 4 levels, with a total capacity of 1400 vehicles.

References

External links

Shopping malls established in 2016
Shopping malls in Algeria
Buildings and structures in Sétif Province
2016 establishments in Algeria
21st-century architecture in Algeria